Ring of Fire is an American neoclassical/progressive/power metal band from Chula Vista, California formed in 2000. Fronted by former Yngwie J. Malmsteen collaborator Mark Boals after the release of his solo album Ring of Fire, the band also included guitarist Tony MacAlpine, Planet X drummer Virgil Donati, grammy-award-winning bassist Philip Bynoe, and keyboardist Steve Weingart. Ring of Fire released three studio albums between 2001 and 2004, as well as a live album, Burning Live In Tokyo 2002. After disbanding, Boals, MacAlpine, and Donati later formed Seven the Hardway. Boals, MacAlpine, and keyboardist Vitalij Kuprij returned in 2014 with their fourth studio album Battle of Leningrad.

Members

Current line-up
 Mark Boals - Vocals
 Tony MacAlpine - Guitar
 Vitalij Kuprij - Keyboards
 Timo Tolkki - Guitar
 Jami Huovinen - drums

Former members
 George Bellas - Guitar
 Steve Weingart - Keyboards
 Philip Bynoe - Bass
 Bjorn Englen - Bass
 Virgil Donati - Drums

Discography

Studio albums
 The Oracle (Avalon, 2001)
 Dreamtower (Frontiers Music, 2002)
 Lapse of Reality (King Records, 2004)
 Battle of Leningrad (Frontiers Music, 2014)
 Gravity (Frontiers Music, 2022)

Live albums
 Burning Live in Tokyo 2002 (Frontiers/Marquee, 2002)

DVD
 Burning Live in Tokyo 2002 (Frontiers/Marquee, 2003)

References

External links
Ring of Fire at Metal Archives

American progressive metal musical groups
Musical groups established in 2000
American power metal musical groups
Heavy metal musical groups from California
Frontiers Records artists